The 1984 Vuelta a España was the 39th edition of the Vuelta a España, one of cycling's Grand Tours. The Vuelta began in Jerez de la Frontera, with a prologue individual time trial on 17 April, and Stage 10 occurred on 27 April with a stage to Burgos. The race finished in Madrid on 6 May.

Prologue
17 April 1984 — Jerez de la Frontera,  (ITT)

Stage 1
18 April 1984 — Jerez de la Frontera to Málaga,

Stage 2
19 April 1984 — Málaga to Almería,

Stage 3
20 April 1984 — Mojácar to Elche,

Stage 4
21 April 1984 — Elche to Valencia,

Stage 5
22 April 1984 — Valencia to Salou,

Stage 6
23 April 1984 — Salou to Sant Quirze del Vallès,

Stage 7
24 April 1984 — Sant Quirze del Vallès to Rasos de Peguera,

Stage 8
25 April 1984 — Cardona to Zaragoza,

Stage 9
26 April 1984 — Zaragoza to Soria,

Stage 10
27 April 1984 — Soria to Burgos,

References

1984 Vuelta a España
Vuelta a España stages